Weather Channel was a 24-hour interactive channel with updated New Zealand weather information operated by MetService which was broadcast on channel 098 on SKY TV.

References

Television stations in New Zealand
Climate of New Zealand
Weather television networks